The 1986 200 Meilen von Nürnberg was the fourth round of the 1986 World Sports-Prototype Championship as well as the fourth round of the 1986 German Supercup.  It took place at the Norisring temporary street circuit, West Germany on June 29, 1986.

Official results
Class winners in bold.  Cars failing to complete 70% of the winner's distance are marked as Not Classified (NC).

† #14 Liqui Moly Equipe was disqualified and no longer timed during the race after ignoring a black flag shown to the car.  The car was black flagged for loose bodywork.

Statistics
 Pole Position - #1 Porsche AG - 0:46.540
 Fastest Lap - #1 Porsche AG - 0:48.280
 Average Speed - 162.702 km/h

References

 
 

Norisring
Norisring
1986 in Bavaria